The GS-600 Arrow is a Colombian homebuilt aircraft that was designed and produced by Ibis Aircraft of Cali, introduced in 2000. When the aircraft was available it was supplied as a complete ready-to-fly-aircraft or as a kit for amateur construction.

Production has been completed and as of 2011 the aircraft was no longer part of the company's product line.

Design and development
The GS-600 Arrow features a strut-braced high-wing, a two-seats-in-side-by-side configuration enclosed cabin with vertically-hinged doors, fixed tricycle landing gear with wheel pants and a single engine in tractor configuration.

The aircraft is made from sheet aluminium "all-metal" construction, with the wing tips and cowling made from composite material. The wing is supported by V-struts and jury struts. The main landing gear is sprung 7075-T6 aluminium, while the nose gear has lever suspension using rubber pucks and helical springs. The main wheels include hydraulic disc brakes.

The standard engine fitted is the  Rotax 912ULS, driving a three-bladed Ivoprop propeller.

Specifications (GS-600 Arrow)

References

External links

GS-600 Arrow
2000s Colombian civil utility aircraft
2000s Colombian ultralight aircraft
Single-engined tractor aircraft
High-wing aircraft
Homebuilt aircraft